Alan Patterson may refer to:

 Alan Patterson (field hockey) (born 1941), New Zealand field hockey player
 Alan Patterson (athlete) (1886–1916), British sprint athlete
 Alan Patterson (motorcycle racer), driver at the 1994 Australian motorcycle Grand Prix

See also
Alan Paterson (1928–1999), British high jumper
Alan Paterson (footballer) (born 1954), Northern Irish footballer and 1988 Northern Ireland Football Writers' Association Player of the Year
Allan Patterson (1919–2009), Canadian politician
Allan Pettersson (1911–1980), Swedish composer